Great River is a suburban hamlet and CDP in the Town of Islip in Suffolk County, New York, United States.

Great River's name derives from "Connetquot," an Algonquian word for "Great River." Prior to the 1900s Great River was primarily home to wealthy families on mansion estates. As of the 2010 census, the population of Great River was 1,489.

Great River's buildings include a New York City-style steak house in a turn of the century (20th) Public house, a delicatessen, a rural delivery post office and the Great River Fire Department.

Geography
Great River is located at  (40.724626, −73.159916).

The Hamlet of Great River comprises 465 land parcels. Great River CDP and the GRFD responsibilities include Heckscher State Park although most references by NY State for mailing addresses are listed as East Islip.

History
For centuries, cluster of the Algonquin people known as the Montaukett Indian Nation occupied the territory known as Secatogue, now the town of Islip. They lived in clusters located at West Islip (Secatogue), Bay Shore (Penataquit), Great River, and Oakdale (Connetquot).

On November 29, 1683, William Nicoll (Nicolls), founder of the Town of Islip and son of New York City Mayor Matthias Nicoll, was awarded the first royal patent to the east end of what is now the Town of Islip. Nicoll purchased land from Sachem (Paramount chief) Winnequaheagh of Connetquot. He named his  plantation (an  tract of land) "Islip Grange", in honor of his ancestral home of Islip (UK) in East Northamptonshire, England, from which Matthias emigrated in 1664. Nicoll's domain extended from East Islip to Bayport and embraced the present-day communities of Sayville, West Sayville, Oakdale, Great River, Islip Terrace, Central Islip, Hauppauge, Holbrook, Bohemia, Brentwood, Holtsville, and a portion of Ronkonkoma. Nicoll paid an annual quit-rent (tax) to Thomas Dongan, 2nd Earl of Limerick and Governor of the Province of New York, of five bushels of good winter wheat or twenty-five (25) shillings payable annually on March 25.

Other early land patentees were Andrew Gibb (Islip hamlet), John Mowbray (Bay Shore, originally Awixa), Stephan Van Cortlandt (Sagtikos Manor), and Thomas Willets (West Islip).

William Nicholl also purchased five islands from Winnequaheagh on November 19, 1687, including Hollins Island (a.k.a. East Fire Island.) The purchase was confirmed on a patent by Governor Dongan on June 4, 1688. Altogether William Nicoll acquired four patents for land – the final purchase was on September 20, 1697, issued by Governor Benjamin Fletcher. Under Col. Fletcher, piracy was a leading economic development tool in New York City's competition with the ports of Boston and Philadelphia. New York City had become a safe place for pirates (freebooters) who carried "real money" into the impoverished colony.

Nicoll's estate eventually became the largest manor on Long Island.

By 1710, the colonial government passed an act to enable the precinct of Islip in the County of Suffolk to elect two assessors, a collector, a constable and a supervisor. The people finally had a voice. Growth, however, remained at a standstill until the American Revolutionary War ended, when in the seventeen (17) years that followed there was more progress than in the fifty (50) years preceding. This activity was partly due to the impact of American shipping.

Great River hamlet was formerly known as Youngsport. In the 1840s the Youngs family lived about one and a half miles south of Montauk Highway on Great River Road. Erastus Youngs and his family began building and repairing boats on the west shore of the Connetquot River near Great South Bay. With hardly anyone else around (21 houses), the place was called Youngsport for thirty years. Youngsport had one store and a freight station on the South Side Railroad of Long Island two miles north of it. The inhabitants were principally known as bay men. Alva Vanderbilt (later Alva Belmont), the Oakdale socialite suffragette, bought the Youngs' home and gave it to Trinity Lutheran Parish of Brooklyn, which used it as a summer camp called "Seaside Camp" for city children. Youngsport Village's name was changed to Great River in either 1870 or 1881.

William Lawrence Breeze purchased  "Timber Point Farm" from William Nicoll in 1883.

The Great River freight station was enhanced to a passenger station in the summer of 1897.

William Nicoll 7th (great-great-great grandson of the original William) served as School Commissioner of East Islip. He was the last owner of Islip Grange.  He served as Warden of Emmanuel Church in Great River for 22 years, and ministered to the small cemetery there in which he is now buried. William 7th donated part of the land on which the present East Islip Junior High School now stands.

Heckscher State Park, named for the industrialist August Heckscher, was part of Nicoll's original estate and the location of the Nicoll Manor house. Heckscher Park's land (Nicholls Neck) was once the location of the 19th-century estates of J. Neal Plumb (original location) and in 1886 George Campbell Taylor. This should not be mistaken for the similarly named, fairly close but much smaller national historic district of Heckscher Park in Huntington on the North Shore of Long Island.

Demographics

As of the 2010 census, there were 1,489 people, 503 households, and 403 families residing in the CDP, down from 1,546 people at the 2000 census. The population density was 323.7 per square mile (125.1/km2). There were 517 housing units at an average density of 112.4/sq mi (43.4/km2). The racial makeup of the CDP was 96.8% White, 0.5% Black, 0.0% Native American, 1.8% Asian, 0.3% some other race, and 0.5% from two or more races. Hispanic or Latino of any race were 4.2% of the population.

There were 503 households, out of which 36.6% had children under the age of 18 living with them, 69.4% were headed by married couples living together, 6.6% had a female householder with no husband present, and 19.9% were non-families. 15.5% of all households were made up of individuals, and 8.2% were someone living alone who was 65 years of age or older. The average household size was 2.96 and the average family size was 3.36.

In the CDP, the population was spread out, with 24.0% under the age of 18, 9.0% from 18 to 24, 16.2% from 25 to 44, 35.0% from 45 to 64, and 15.8% who were 65 years of age or older. The median age was 45.5 years. For every 100 females, there were 105.4 males. For every 100 females age 18 and over, there were 100.5 males.

For the period 2007–2011, the median annual income for a household in the CDP was $127,578, and the median income for a family was $176,974. Males had a median income of $80,625 versus $70,781 for females. The per capita income for the CDP was $57,414. Because of high margins of error, the number of persons living under the poverty line was not known.

District information
Great River votes in New York's 2nd congressional district. National elections are held at the Great River Fire Department, with local election years at Timber Point Elementary School.

Great River Post Office, at 62 Great River Road (Zip code 11739), is a rural delivery post office where all mail is only delivered to P.O. boxes required to be included in one's mailing address.

Great River spans four hurricane evacuation zones.

Public education
East Islip School District UFSD serves Great River. Students in the hamlet go to Timber Point Elementary School, East Islip Middle School, and East Islip High School. The school district's colors are red and white, and athletic teams are the Redmen (no mascot.)

Timber Point Elementary School was one of four L.I. National Blue Ribbon Schools Program honorees in 2012. The National Blue Ribbon Schools Program honors public and non-public schools whose students achieve at very high levels. The program is part of a larger U.S. Department of Education effort to identify and disseminate knowledge about best school leadership and teaching practices.

Emergency services

The Great River Fire Department (established in 1916) is a volunteer fire department, located at 108 River Road in front of Timber Point County Park, east of the entrance to Heckscher State Park. Heckscher State Park and Bayard Cutting Arboretum are serviced within Great River Fire Department district. Great River Fire Department competes as "Team River Rat."

The area lies within the Suffolk County Police Department 3rd precinct.

Exchange Ambulance of the Islips (established 1951) provides 24/7 Emergency Medical Service (EMS) coverage for Great River.

Hospitals/medical centers near Great River
 Southside Hospital (Acute Care Hospitals, voluntary non-profit–private, provides emergency services, about 5 miles away in Bay Shore)
 Good Samaritan Hospital Medical Care Center (Acute Care Hospitals, voluntary non-profit–church, provides emergency services, about 8 miles away in West Islip)
 Brookhaven Memorial Hospital Medical Center (Acute Care Hospitals, voluntary non-profit–private, provides emergency services, about 9 miles away in Patchogue)
 Stony Brook University Hospital (Acute Care Hospitals, voluntary non-profit–private, provides emergency services, about 21 miles away in Stony Brook; the largest academic medical center on Long Island)

Membership Organizations
Great River Community Association's (GRCA) mission is to foster, promote and protect the civic and community interests of the residents of Great River. GRCA sponsors a variety of events during the year for residents to enjoy. Ex: Easter Egg Hunt, Memorial Day Parade, Paint & Sip at the Firehouse, Halloween Parade, and a Holiday- Tree and Menorah Lighting Party.  The community also enjoys an Annual Holiday Boat Parade complete with Grucci Fireworks on the Beautiful Connetquot River.

Troop 205 of the Suffolk County Council (Boy Scouts of America) Sagtikos District is an active participant in the community of Youth organizations in the United States. Troop 205 is proud and grateful to be sponsored by the over one-hundred (100) year old Great River, NY Fire Department (GRFD.) Eagle Scout, the highest scouting achievement, has been bestowed approximately eighty-five (85) times since 1991 to participants in Troop 205 from the local Islip area.

Transportation
Great River, a station on the Montauk Branch of the Long Island Rail Road, is located at Connetquot Avenue and Hawthorne Avenue between Sunrise Highway (NYS Route 27) and Montauk Highway (Route 27A).

Prior to the establishment of passenger service, the site of Great River Station was occupied by a freight-only station built by the South Side Railroad of Long Island and known as Youngsport Station. This was a popular stop for Gilded Age wealthy businessmen traveling to South Side Sportsmen's Club in Connetquot River State Park Preserve after the Club House Station closed in 1897.

Suffolk County Transit Bus routes 40 & 3C are connecting services.

Alternatively, Central Islip on the LIRR Ronkonkoma Branch is very close (seven miles to the north), with more frequent trains.

Notable sites

Sunrise Business Center

Sunrise Business Center located at 3500 Sunrise Highway (originally a Grumman Aerospace site and then technology reinvigorated the site as "Long Island Business & Technology Center") is a sprawling 355,000-square-foot structure offering the same technologically advanced infrastructure on Long Island that Rudin Management developed at its New York Information Technology Center at 55 Broad Street in Manhattan.  A link from the building's fiber-optic network to New York National Grid's network allows high-speed transmission of data – 10 billion bits of information per second – to domestic and global networks.  The 82-acre site permits the construction of 787,000 square feet of additional space.

Lessing's claims to be the USA's oldest family owned continuous operating highly diversified food service company and is headquartered in Great River.

United States Coast Guard National Response Center (NRC) is a part of the federally established National Response System and staffed 24 hours a day by the U.S. Coast Guard.  for NRC Great River, NY is the headquarters at Sunrise Business Center with > 500 employees globally.

St. Joseph's College (New York) moved into 27,500 square feet of office space at Metropolitan Realty Associates' Sunrise Business Center in Great River, NY. St. Joseph's, which has campuses in Brooklyn and Patchogue, is taking the entire 4,000-square-foot freestanding building at the complex entrance.

St. George's University is a Private university, offering degrees in medicine, veterinary medicine, public health, the health sciences, nursing, arts and sciences, and business. St. George's University School of Medicine is affiliated with CityDoctors scholarship program.

Netsmart Technologies is a holding company specialized in delivering software and hardware & S/W services in the human services field, specifically for behavioral health providers such as psychiatric hospitals and mental health clinics.

Connetquot River

Connetquot River (a.k.a. Great River) is a  river particularly known for its brook, brown and rainbow trout fly fishing and Crab trapping from docks.  The river flows into NYS' Nicoll Bay past Nicoll Island.  Recognized by NY state as a Wild, Scenic and Recreational River Connetquot River is one of the four largest rivers on Long Island.

Connetquot River's entire habitat represents the largest undeveloped contiguous area within Suffolk County that covers an entire river watershed. However, only the Estuary portion south of Sunrise Hwy NY Rte 27 is officially named Connetquot River although in popular usage both the brook and river share the same name.

Connetquot River within the confines of Great River has multiple locations for enjoying the water including public and private docks and launch sites. There are three public locations including one with a ramp for launching mid-size Boat trailered vessels plus another launch site in NYS' Heckscher Park.  There are at least two private launch sites.

Great River Ramp (a.k.a. Memorial Park) allows public access to launch mid-sized vessels from trailers.  The ramp park is easily recognized by the flag pole and a large memorial stone dedicated to armed forces deceased residents.  Winter season adds a holiday tree and a menorah to the entrance.  Adirondack chairs donated and installed by BSA Troop 205 are also outside the gate.

Great River Dock is a small park, at approximately 400 Great River Road, with open access to the river for fishing and crabbing. However, no boat launching is permitted at this location.  Picking up or dropping people here is also prohibited. The park has stations for cutting bait and working on the crabs or fish.  There are benches provided by NYS and the local BSA Troop 205 donated and installed picnic tables and Adirondack seating.  This is a popular location for enjoying Great River Community events such as an annual holiday boat parade on Thanksgiving weekend with Fireworks by Grucci as well as Grucci fireworks at other times of the year largely sponsored by Oakdale restaurants.  The park closes at dusk except for special events and is considered very safe.

A public small sandy beach section on the main land near Nicoll Island, sometimes erroneously titled Timber Point Park due to proximity to the golf course, is water level and especially good for launching kayaks and canoes.  Motorized vessels are prohibited from launching here and the shallow and sandy bottom would likely cause a "failure to launch."  Great River Community Association usually sponsors an annual kayaking BBQ in the summer.  Long Island schools also use it for practice of their crew teams.  Nicoll Island has a stretch of clean white sand that can be reached by kayak.

Emmanuel Episcopal Church
Emanuel Episcopal Church, the "Little Chapel", on Great River Road, became a reality in 1862 when Mr. and Mrs. William Nicoll deeded one-half acre of land. The bell in the chapel tower was inscribed with the words, "Emmanuel Church, Islip, L.I., Thou shall open my lips, O'Lord and my mouth shall show thee praise".

Located at the site of the original chapel's entrance is a stained glass window from France donated by the Plum family. Tiffany glass windows known as the Sarah Nicoll's "Crown of Heaven" and the William Nicoll's "Jewel Cross" were donated as a memorial by the Nicoll family. Other Tiffany windows were also presented to Emmanuel from 1903 to 1915.

Mr. & Mrs. W. Bayard Cutting donated the funds to build and furnish the church rectory in 1889.

Emmanuel Church Cemetery is located directly behind the church. Some of those interred there are William Nicholl VII and the financier H. B. Hollins.

In 2012 Emmanuel Episcopal Church observed a year-long 150th anniversary celebration of its founding on November 16, 1862.

Timber Point Country Club
Timber Point Golf Course is a public 27-hole regulation length, full-service facility, located south of Montauk Highway in Great River. Positioned where the Connetquot River meets the Great South Bay.

Timber Point, was originally an 18-hole golf course designed by the architectural team of Colt & Alison. The club was built and formed in the Roaring Twenties, along with other prominent estates that were constructed along the South Shore during that time. The original mansion now serves as the clubhouse and still overlooks the  property, much the same way it did for club founders Horace Havermeyer, Buell Hollister and W. Kingsland Macy.

In 1925 Angel de la Torre, Spain's first golf professional, agreed to travel to the United States to play in the U.S. Open. In that same year, upon the recommendations of Captain Allison (a premier architect whom he had met in England), he accepted the position of golf professional at the newly built Timber Point Country Club. At one time, Timber Point was in the top 100 courses in the United States.

Aside from being immensely difficult from the back tees (6,825 yards, par 71, in 1925), Timber Point probably offered about as much terrain-oriented variety as one could imagine. Its front nine initially ventured near the bay, then proceeded back inland through a series of British heath-like holes, then across some Pine Valley-like sandy terrain. The inward half, which was largely constructed on reclaimed marshland, included several of the boldest holes of the course, including the 460-yard par-four eleventh (featuring three distinct driving areas), the 470-yard par-four fourteenth and the 205-yard into-the-wind fifteenth, modeled after Dr. Alister MacKenzie's famous Gibraltar hole at Moortown Golf Club, England. The sixteenth and seventeen were true seaside holes, and the 510-yard eighteenth, one of the few holes routed with the prevailing breeze, offered the aggressive player a chance to close in style.

Timber Point exists in a heavily altered state since its present owner, Suffolk County, long ago turned it into a 27-hole (three courses of nine holes) facility. Were its original design still intact, it would surely rate very near the top of Long Island's best courses. The course is open seven days a week (in season), opening March 15 and with the last day of golf as December 30.

The Suffolk County Parks Department of Recreation & Conservation Golf Courses headquarters is located at Timber Point. Since the department's relocation here, the course has had substantial improvements.

Timber Point Marina
Timber Point Marina is situated on the Great South Bay within the Timber Point Country Club, divided into two separate areas that provide a total of 153 slips, a fuel dock, sewage pump-out station, restrooms, electrical hookups and water. Transient slips are also available.

Bayard-Cutting Arboretum
Bayard Cutting Arboretum State Park was part of the former Bayard Cutting Estate. Originally comprising  and 12 buildings, the estate of William Bayard Cutting (1850–1912) was donated as an arboretum to the State of New York by Cutting's widow and daughter, Mrs. Olivia James.

Westbrook estate has been listed on the National Register of Historic Places since 1973 as a national historic district.

Bayard Cutting Arboretum State Park consists of a notable large Tudor-style English country house called "Westbrook" and its surrounding landscaped gardens. The house was designed by architect Charles C. Haight in 1886 for William Bayard Cutting, who was an attorney, financier, real estate developer, sugar beet refiner and philanthropist. Located in the former Cutting residence are magnificent fireplaces, woodworkings, and stained glass windows.

An annex to the mansion was built in 1890 and contained a billiards room, a small organ, a gaming room and guest rooms.

Landscape design was done by Frederick Law Olmsted, popularly considered to be father of American landscape architecture. Olmsted was famous for co-designing many well known urban parks with his senior partner Calvert Vaux, including Central Park and Prospect Park in New York City.

Currently the manor house contains the administration office and a café.

Westbrook, Suffolk County, New York 
Westbrook, a large rambling house of many gables and tall chimneys on the South Shore of Long Island, lies on the west bank of Connetquot River.

Westbrook was designed in 1886 for William Bayard Cutting (1850–1912) by the architect Charles C. Haight in the Tudor style.  Scottish heather was shipped to provide thatch for the gate house, which remains at the corner of Montauk Highway and Great River Road. In 1895 Cutting and his brother Robert Fulton Cutting laid out a golf course at Westbrook, known to be the first private golf course in the United States.

Heckscher State Park
Heckscher State Park, known as the "Home of the White-tailed Deer", is on the shore of the Great South Bay. Islip's founder, William Nicoll, originally built his Islip Grange estate on this property.

Heckscher Park was once the 19th century estate of J. Neal Plum and then George Campbell Taylor. The park was purchased by the State of New York using a donation by the affluent August Heckscher in 1929.

The park offers a beach, a boat launch, pavilions with picnic tables, a playground, playing fields, recreation programs, hiking, biking, fishing, and cross-country skiing.  Unfortunately, a campground with tent and trailer sites, an olympic-sized swimming pool and a food concession are all closed due to NYS funding cuts (2015.)

The park is accessible by the Heckscher State Parkway (end of the Southern State Parkway) at the last exit, No. 46.

The Long Island Philharmonic plays a concert in the park every July.

Suffolk County Marathon To Support Our Veterans, initiated in 2015, starts and ends in Heckscher State Park during mid September.  "Taste of Long Island" food festival begins in the park after the Marathon.

Lorillard Estate and Racing Stable
George L. Lorillard (March 26, 1843 – 1892) was an American, New York City tobacco tycoon and a prominent Thoroughbred racehorse owner. He built a large stable and racing horse training track. Lorillard's racing stable was handled by horse trainer R. Wyndham Walden. They won the Preakness Stakes a record five straight years between 1878 and 1882, the Belmont Stakes in 1878, 1880, and 1881 and the Travers Stakes in 1878 and 1880. Among George Lorillard's best horses were Saunterer, Vanguard, Grenada, Tom Ochiltree, and Duke of Magenta. In 1878, Duke of Magenta won the Preakness Stakes, the Withers Stakes, the Belmont Stakes, and the Travers Stakes, a feat accomplished since by only two other colts: Man o' War and Native Dancer. Even 2015's American Pharoah won the current American Triple Crown but finished a close second in a hard-fought Travers Stakes snapping a winning streak of eight races.

The United States Congress shut down on October 24, 1877, for a day so its members could attend "The Great Race" at Pimlico Race Course in Baltimore, Maryland. The event was a  match race run by a trio of champions: Ten Broeck, Tom Ochiltree and Parole. Ten Broeck, the Kentucky champion, was owned by F. B. Harper. Tom Ochiltree, the Eastern champion and winner of the 1875 Preakness Stakes, was owned by George L. Lorillard. Parole, a gelding, was owned by Pierre Lorillard IV, George's brother. Parole, with jockey William Barrett up, prevailed with a late run, crossing the finish line three lengths ahead of Ten Broeck and six ahead of Tom Ochiltree, which had helped to set the early pace with legendary jockey George Barbee in the irons. An estimated 20,000 people crowded into Pimlico to witness the event. The Great Race is depicted in a four-ton stone bas-relief — copied from a Currier & Ives print and sculpted in stone by Bernard Zuckerman – hanging over the clubhouse entrance at Pimlico.

In 1884 George Lorillard sold much of his estate to William Bayard Cutting.

Notable people
 William Nicoll (Nicholls), an English aristocrat who was awarded a royal patent, purchased "East of Islip" surrounding land on November 29, 1683.
 William Nicoll 3rd, known as "Lawyer Nicoll", served as Clerk of Suffolk County, New York from 1749 until his death in 1780. He erected St. Johns Episcopal Church and Cemetery.
 Benjamin Nicoll, brother of William Nicoll 3rd.  Benjamin left a widow, Charity Floyd, who eventually married the Reverend Doctor Samuel Johnson.
 William Nicoll 4th, the fourth owner of Islip Grange, lived only 39 years.
 William Nicoll 7th, School Commissioner of East Islip, New York, was the last owner of Islip Grange. He served as Warden of Emmanuel Episcopal Church in Great River for 22 years and ministered to the small cemetery there in which he is buried. William 7th also donated part of the land on which the present (2015) East Islip Junior High School now stands.
 Frances Louisa Nicoll, wife of Civil War brevet lieutenant colonel and eventually Civil War Union Brigadier general William Ludlow. Frances was sister to William Nicoll 7th.
 George L. Lorillard (March 26, 1843 – 1892), tobacco manufacturer and racehorse owner
 Marie Louise Lafarge (Lorillard), later Countess Di Agreda (Spain), was married to George L. Lorillard.
 William Bayard Cutting, attorney, financier, real estate developer, sugar beet refiner, ferry operator, railroad baron and philanthropist, owned a  estate in Great River eventually given to the people of Long Island by Bayard Cutting's widow, Olivia, and daughter, Olivia, as Bayard Cutting Arboretum State Park. Mr. Cutting was a member and Vice President of the South Side Sportsmen's Club.
* Olivia Peyton Cutting (née Murray) (1855–1949,) the daughter of Bronson Murray of Murray Hill family, was married to William Bayard Cutting.  Mrs. Cutting's children are William Bayard Cutting, Jr., Bronson M. Cutting, Justine Bayard Cutting (Ward,) and Olivia M. Cutting (James.) Mrs. Cutting sat as mythical Phaedra for the French artist Alexandre Cabanel's Phaedra portrait.  This work was exhibited in the Salon of 1880 and later donated by Cabanel to the Musée Fabre.
 Cutting children born in Great River
 William Bayard Cutting, Jr. (1878– d. 1910 of tuberculosis) secretary to the US embassy to the Court of St James for the Sovereign of the United Kingdom.
 Bronson M. Cutting, born in Great River, Republican to the United States Senate from New Mexico, publisher, and military attaché who was killed in an airplane crash.
 Justine Bayard Cutting (Ward) (1879–1975), daughter of William Bayard Cutting, was born in Great River. She developed the Ward Method of music education as a way to teach sight-singing to children in Catholic schools to promote the Gregorian chant.
 Olivia M. Cutting (James) (1892–1949), married Pulitzer Prize awardee Henry James (biographer), son of psychologist William James, in 1917 but eventually ended in divorce.
 Angel de la Torre, Spain's first golf professional, was golf pro at Timber Point Golf Course in 1925.
 Philip Boyle (1961–), Republican, 2013 New York 4th Senatorial District Senator, lived in Great River at one time and is still active in the Great River Fire Department in 2015.
 Tim Melia (1986–), born in Great River, May 15, 1986, is an American soccer player who plays goalie (# 29) for Sporting Kansas City (2015– ) of Major League Soccer.  Melia played for the Long Island Rough Riders in the USL Premier Development League in 2007.
 LeeAnn Lewis (née Vogel) Competitive United States Golf Association (USGA) female U.S. amateur golfer.

Filmography 
 The Age of Innocence, directed by Martin Scorsese and starring Daniel Day-Lewis, Winona Ryder, Michelle Pfeiffer and Joanne Woodward, based on the 1920 novel by Edith Wharton, about the Gilded Age, portraying New York's high society, filmed the Archery/lawn party scene (1:28,) at the historic Bayard Cutting Arboretum.

References

External links
 

Islip (town), New York
Census-designated places in New York (state)
Hamlets in New York (state)
Census-designated places in Suffolk County, New York
Hamlets in Suffolk County, New York
Populated coastal places in New York (state)